Stackable Unified Module Interconnect Technology (SUMIT) is a connector between expansion buses independent of motherboard form factor. Boards featuring SUMIT connectors are usually used in "stacks" where one board sits on top of another.
It was published by the Small Form Factor Special Interest Group.

Details
Two identical connectors carry the signals specified by the standard. Commonly referred to as SUMIT A & SUMIT B, designers have the option of designing with either both SUMIT A and B, or just SUMIT A. The signals carried within each connector is as follows:

SUMIT A:
 One PCI-Express x1 lane
 Four USB 2.0
 ExpressCard
 LPC
 SPI/uWire
 SMBus/I2C Bus

SUMIT B:
 One PCI-Express x1 lane
 One PCI-Express x4 or four more PCI-Express x1 lanes

As of August 2009, three board form factors used the SUMIT connectors for embedded applications: ISM or SUMIT-ISM [90mm × 96mm], Pico-ITXe [72mm × 100mm], and  Pico-I/O [60mm × 72mm].

See also
 VMEbus
 VPX
 CompactPCI
 PC/104
 Pico-ITXe

References

External links
 Small Form Factor Special Interest Group
 SFF-SIG SUMIT specification overview page
 SUMIT Specifications version 1.5
 Samtec SUMIT connector page
 SFF-SIG Pico-ITXe overview page
 SUMIT compliant SBC/Host boards & I/O Card vendors

Motherboard form factors
Computer buses
Embedded systems